The Drakan Spyder is an American open sports car manufactured by Sector111 based on the Palatov Motorsport, LLC D2. It has a 6.2 GM LS3 V-8 engine that achieves a  time of 3.2 seconds.

References

External links

 The Drakan Spyder is the Ultimate American Track Toy: First Drive
 The Drakan Spyder Is a Corvette-Powered American Take on the Ariel Atom

Roadsters